"Lluvia al Corazón" (English: "Rain to the Heart") is the first single from Mexican Latin pop/Rock en Español band Maná's eighth studio album Drama y Luz. The song is produced by Fher Olvera & Alex González.
.

Chart performance
The song became a number-one debut on the Hot Latin Songs and Latin Pop Songs chart.

Weekly charts

Year-end charts

References

2011 singles
Maná songs
Spanish-language songs
Songs written by Fher Olvera
Warner Music Latina singles